Anton Sebastianpillai FRCP (23 January 1945 – 4 April 2020), was a British historian, author (writing as Anton Sebastian) and consultant geriatrician, of Sri Lankan Tamil origin.

Biography
He had his primay and secondary education at St Sylvester's College, Kandy and trained at Peradeniya Medical School, in Sri Lanka, qualifying in 1967.

He gave talks to the Foreign Correspondents' Club, New Delhi, India, and gave the 'Millennium Oration' of the Sri Lanka Medical Association of North America.

He died on 4 April 2020, at Kingston Hospital, London, after contracting COVID-19 while working there. He had been admitted to the hospital's intensive care unit on 31 March and was aged 75.

He was a bibliophile, with a collection of rare books on Sri Lanka and on medical history.

Works 

As Anton Sebastian he wrote a number of reference works:

 
 
 
 

His Dictionary of the History of Medicine won a British Medical Association Medical Book Award.

References 

1940s births
2020 deaths
20th-century British non-fiction writers
20th-century Sri Lankan historians
Alumni of the University of Ceylon (Peradeniya)
Bibliophiles
20th-century British medical doctors
21st-century British medical doctors
Fellows of the Royal College of Physicians
Deaths from the COVID-19 pandemic in England
British geriatricians
Place of birth missing
Sri Lankan emigrants to the United Kingdom
Sri Lankan non-fiction writers
Sri Lankan Tamil physicians
Sri Lankan Tamil writers
Year of birth missing
Sri Lankan Tamil historians
20th-century British historians
21st-century British historians